The Garnet Canyon Trail is a  ( round-trip) long hiking trail in Grand Teton National Park in the U.S. state of Wyoming. At the  point, the trail forks from the Amphitheater Lake Trail and heads south and then west into Garnet Canyon. Garnet Canyon is the most popular approach route for climbers attempting to summit not only Grand Teton but also Middle Teton, South Teton, Teepe Pillar and Disappointment Peak. Though the trail becomes unmaintained once it enters boulder fields at approximately the  elevation point, climbers continue on to other destinations such as the Lower Saddle, a high altitude mountain pass situated between Middle and Grand Teton.

See also
List of hiking trails in Grand Teton National Park

References

Hiking trails of Grand Teton National Park